Fitzwilliam Lawn Tennis Club is a tennis and squash club in south Dublin, Ireland. Established in 1877, Fitzwilliam is one of the oldest tennis clubs in the world. It has held the Irish Open annually since the late 19th century.

History
In November 1877 ten men met to found the Dublin Lawn Tennis Club. This club was to initially consist of 30 members each paying an annual subscription of three pounds. They next met on 23 November 1877 and discussed leasing grounds in Upper Pembroke Street near to Fitzwilliam Square, Dublin, Ireland owned by Sir Francis Brady a judge on a lease of ten years for a rent of twenty five pounds per year. On 6 December 1877 another meeting was convened and the committee assembled and agreed to adopt the name Fitzwilliam Lawn Tennis Club as recommended by one of its members. In 1879 the Fitzwilliam Lawn Tennis Club staged its first Irish Lawn Tennis Championships at Wilton Square which remained the host location of that event until 1903.

In 1880 the club had reached the point where there was not enough room for expansion at its current location. The club therefore purchased available land at Wilton Place and a building No. 6 Wilton Place that was converted to serve as the club's premises, in addition tennis courts were also constructed. Those grounds today form Wilton Park. In 1902 the club decided to build a pavilion at the club grounds which was financed through the sale of No 6 Wilton Place.

In 1903 the Irish Championships venue was moved from Fitzwilliam Square to Wilton Place. In 1969 the members of Fitzwilliam Lawn Tennis Club met to discuss a move to a site at Appian Way, Dublin which was concluded that year. During the move the club replaced a Victorian building named Epworth Hall (previously Winton House), which was sold by Wesley College Dublin. The Irish Open Tennis Championships continued to be played at Wilton Place until 1972, when they moved to the new venue at Appian Way, Dublin 6.

Current tournaments
 AIG Irish Open Championships (2017–present).

Former tournaments
The Fitzwilliam Lawn Tennis Club has organised many notable tournaments throughout the years.
 Fitzwilliam Club Championships 
 Fitzwilliam Plate
 Fitzwilliam Purse
 Irish Hard Court Championships
 Irish Lawn Tennis Championships  
 Irish Open 
 Shelbourne Irish Open

References 

Tennis in Ireland
Sports venues in Dublin (city)
Sports clubs established in 1877
1877 establishments in Ireland